Eupithecia asempiterna is a moth in the family Geometridae first described by Hiroshi Inoue in 2000. It is found in India and Nepal.

References

Moths described in 2000
asempiterna
Moths of Asia